A wheelie is a vehicle maneuver in which the front wheel or wheels come off the ground.

Wheelie may also refer to:

 Wheelie (Transformers), Transformers character
 Wheelie and the Chopper Bunch, Hanna-Barbera character
 Wheelie bin, waste container
 Adventure Wheely II, a French powered parachute design

See also
 Wheelies, a virtual-world nightclub